Ivan Howard Venning (born 26 December 1945) is an Australian politician and was the Liberal Party member of the South Australian House of Assembly from 1990 until 2014. He did not re-contest his seat at the 2014 state election.

Venning was one of five children and the eldest son to Howard and Shirley Venning. Howard himself entered state parliament at the 1968 election and served for 11 years. Venning attended Crystal Brook Primary School and Prince Alfred College in Adelaide, and worked on the family farm until 1966, when he was called up for National Service, serving in the Royal Australian Artillery as a gunner, operator and batman to the Commanding Officer III Battery. Venning also served for 10 years in local government, and is a Justice of the Peace.

Venning was elected to parliament at the 1990 Custance by-election. The seat was abolished in place of Schubert in time for the 1997 state election.

In 1994, Venning was elected as Chair of the Environment, Resources and Development (ERD) Committee—a position he held for four years, and has served in the committee since 2006. He also served on the Public Works Committee for four years. He was Opposition Whip from 2006 to 2010.

Notes

References

Schubert 2006 Poll Bludger Profile
Schubert 2010 Poll Bludger Profile
 

Members of the South Australian House of Assembly
Liberal Party of Australia members of the Parliament of South Australia
1945 births
Living people
People educated at Prince Alfred College
Amateur radio people
21st-century Australian politicians